Doom Runners (1997) is an Australian science fiction television children's film.

Premise
The story concerns a group of children in a post-apocalyptic world searching for the last unpolluted place on Earth, New Eden. However, the Doom Troopers (DTs), led by Dr. Kao (Tim Curry), want to get there first and will do anything to stop the children. Prior to the film's release, Curry noted that the production resembled a "'Mad Max' for kids."

Telecast premiere
Produced in cooperation between America's Paramount-owned Showtime and Nickelodeon, the film was telecast on Showtime starting 20 December 1997. Later that year, it was telecast on Nickelodeon from 25 April 1998, the first original full-length feature film to air on that network.

References

External links
 
 
 Doom Runners at Screen Australia

1997 films
1997 television films
1990s science fiction films
Australian children's films
Australian television films
Films about children
Films set in the future
Australian post-apocalyptic films
1990s children's films
Australian science fiction films
1990s English-language films